HP1 or variant, may refer to:

 Heterochromatin Protein 1, an important marker molecule in epigenetic research
 The postal code for part of Hemel Hempstead in Dacorum, see HP postcode area
 hP1, a Pearson symbol
 Harry Potter and the Philosopher's Stone, the first novel in J.K. Rowling's Harry Potter series
 Harry Potter and the Philosopher's Stone (film), the first film in J.K. Rowling's Harry Potter series
 Handley Page Type A aka H.P.1, an airplane
 HP-1, a glider designed by Richard Schreder
 HP1, a type of photographic stock, see Ilford HP
 Haemophilus phage HP1, a virus
 Hp.1 (proceed), from German railway signalling

See also
HP (disambiguation)